The Stübenwasen is the sixth highest mountain in the Black Forest after the Feldberg, Baldenweger Buck, Seebuck, Herzogenhorn and the Belchen. It is the highest point on the ridge between Schauinsland and Feldberg and is only separated from the latter by a wide saddle. To the north is the St. Wilhelm Valley, to the south the Wiesental with Todtnau and Todtnauberg.

Vegetation and use 
The summit of the Stübenwasen is not wooded. The sudden transitions to forest show, however, that this is not a natural treeline. The Stübenwasen would not be treeless just on account of its height; the treeline here, about 100 kilometres north of the nearest north Alpine peak could be expected to lie at about 1,650–. The highlands are used in summer as cattle pasture, in winter as a ski area.

Tourism 

The Stübenwasen is thus well developed for tourism, although it is not accessible by car, like for example the Feldberg or the Kandel. West of the summit is an inn, the Berggasthaus Stübenwasen (1,270 m), built in 1935. It is accessible in summer on the footpath between Feldberg and Notschrei, and in winter on the Stübenwasenspur.

References

External links 
 Notschrei loipe
 http://www.freiburg-schwarzwald.de/stuebenwasen.htm Hiking on the Stübenwasen

One-thousanders of Germany
Mountains and hills of Baden-Württemberg
Mountains and hills of the Black Forest